Joey LaRocque (born March 15, 1986) was a former American football linebacker. He was drafted by the Chicago Bears in the seventh round of the 2008 NFL Draft. He played college football at College of the Canyons and at Oregon State.

He was also a member of the Omaha Nighthawks and New York Jets.

Professional career

Chicago Bears
He was drafted by the Bears in the seventh round of the 2008 NFL Draft. He was signed to a four-year contract May 30, 2008. After beginning his rookie season on the team's practice squad, he was signed to the active roster on September 19. He appeared in 14 games for the Bears as a rookie, recording six tackles.

LaRocque was waived by the Bears on July 30, 2009.

New York Jets
LaRocque was signed to a future contract by the New York Jets on January 5, 2011. He was waived September 2.

References

External links
Just Sports Stats
Chicago Bears bio
Oregon State Beavers bio

1986 births
Living people
Sportspeople from Los Angeles County, California
Players of American football from California
American football linebackers
College of the Canyons Cougars football players
Oregon State Beavers football players
People from Agoura Hills, California
Chicago Bears players
Omaha Nighthawks players
New York Jets players